Valeria Alejandra Meza Cárdenas (born 8 November 1999) is a Mexican professional footballer who currently plays as a defender for FC Juárez in Liga MX Femenil.

Club career

C.F. Guadalajara
Meza began playing for Guadalajara during the inaugural season of Liga MX Femenil. In July 2017, she helped the team win the inaugural Tapatío Women's Classic. Later the same year, she helped Chivas win the Apertura 2017, the first ever Mexican professional women's soccer championship. Chivas won the second leg of the final in front of a record-breaking 32,466 spectators.

International career
In 2017, Meza was called up to Mexico women's national under-20 football team.

Honours

Club
Guadalajara
Liga MX Femenil: Apertura 2017

Notes

References

External links
 
 Valeria Meza at C.D. Guadalajara Femenil 

1999 births
Living people
Mexican women's footballers
People from Zapopan, Jalisco
Liga MX Femenil players
C.D. Guadalajara (women) footballers
Club Necaxa (women) footballers
Mexico women's youth international footballers
Women's association football defenders
21st-century Mexican women
20th-century Mexican women